Amreli railway station  is a railway station serving in Amreli district of Gujarat State of India.  It is under Bhavnagar railway division of Western Railway Zone of Indian Railways. Passenger trains halt here.

Major trains

 52929/52930 Amreli–Veraval MG Passenger (unreserved)
 52933/52946 Amreli–Veraval MG Passenger (unreserved)
 52955/52956 Amreli–Junagadh MG Passenger (unreserved)

References

Railway stations in Amreli district
Bhavnagar railway division